2-Methyl-6-nitrobenzoic anhydride is an organic acid anhydride also known as the Shiina reagent, having a structure wherein carboxylic acids undergo intermolecular dehydration condensation.
It was developed in 2002 by Prof. Isamu Shiina (Tokyo University of Science, Japan). The compound is often abbreviated MNBA.

Abstract 
The reagent is used for synthetic reactions wherein medium- and large-sized lactones are formed from hydroxycarboxylic acids via intramolecular ring closure (Shiina macrolactonization). The reaction proceeds at room temperature under basic or neutral conditions. This reagent can be used not only for macrolactonization but also for esterification, amidation, and peptide coupling.

See also 
 Condensation reaction
 Fischer-Speier esterification
 Mitsunobu reaction
 Shiina esterification
 Steglich esterification
 Yamaguchi esterification

References

External links 
 2-Methyl-6-nitrobenzoic Anhydride (MNBA) 
 Enantioselective Total Synthesis of Octalactin A Using Asymmetric Aldol Reactions and a Rapid Lactonization To Form a Medium-Sized Ring 
 Total Synthesis of Iejimalide B. An Application of the Shiina Macrolactonization 

Carboxylic anhydrides
Nitro compounds